Pau and His Brother is a 2001 Spanish-French drama film directed by Marc Recha. It was entered into the 2001 Cannes Film Festival.

Cast
 David Selvas - Pau
 Nathalie Boutefeu - Marta
 Marieta Orozco - Sara
 Luis Hostalot - Emili
 Alicia Orozco - Mercè
 Juan Márquez - Toni
 David Recha - Alex
 Patrícia Bargalló
 Joan Guzmán - Pere
 Sonia Martínez - Chica juzgados
 Mónica Muñoz - Chica piso
 Lourdes Pons - Remel
 Loïc Savouré - Jean Pierre (voice)
 María Tort - Teresina
 Seraff Tort - Republicano

See also
 List of Spanish films of 2001

References

External links

2001 films
Spanish drama films
French drama films
2000s Spanish-language films
2000s French-language films
2000s Catalan-language films
2001 drama films
Films directed by Marc Recha
2000s French films
2000s Spanish films